Fidenza railway station (Stazione di Fidenza) is a station that serves the Italian city of Fidenza. It is located on the Milan–Bologna railway and lines branch off to Cremona, to Fornovo and to the nearby Salsomaggiore Terme.

History 
The station was called "Borgo San Donnino" until 1927, as was the city.
 
The station and the surrounding area have undergone a major redevelopment, with work starting in the second half of the first decade of the 2000s. After several delays in the completion of the works, the first results were seen in 2013, with the total renovation of the internal rooms, including the waiting room, central atrium, and ticket office. In the same year, a pedestrian underpass was built connecting the square in front of the station to the Via Marconi.
 
In 2017, after the installation of three lifts serving the three platforms used for passenger services, the last phase of the redevelopment work began, which was completed at the beginning of 2018. This resulted in the raising of all platforms to 55 cm above the rail and the installation of a shelter serving platforms 4 and 5, while the entire passenger building was painted in Parma yellow.

Buildings and infrastructure
The two-storey station building, of which only the ground floor can be accessed by passengers, was built in the 1920s in a project led by the engineer Enzo Bianchi.
 
Rete Ferroviaria Italiana is in charge of the management of the infrastructure. The station has eight platforms, including two tracks on the west side, which are used by trains to Salsomaggiore Terme, and one on the east side.

Rail services
The station is an important railway junction, served by all Trenitalia regional trains on the Piacenza–Bologna–Ancona route, giving direct hourly connections to all the major towns along the Via Emilia. Regional services bound for Milan also stop, including three services operated by TPER, and one operated by Trenord.
 
 
The line to  has hourly rail services, alternating with some substitute bus services, connecting with trains to/from Parma and Bologna.
 
 
All daytime Intercity trains on the Milan–Bologna line also stop in Fidenza.

Services 
 
The station has:
  bar
  ticket counter
  ticket machines
  shops
  railway police station
  waiting room
  toilets.

Interchanges 
  bus stop.
 
The terminus of the Borgo San Donnino-Salsomaggiore tramway was located near the station between 1890 and 1937. It was shared by the Soragna–Borgo San Donnino tramway, which was opened in 1894 and also closed in 1937.

References

Railway stations in Emilia-Romagna
Railway stations opened in 1859